Birougou National Park, also known as the Monts Birougou Wetlands, is a national park in central Gabon. It contains extremely dense rain forest in the Chaillu Mountains and is one of the two parks where the endemic sun-tailed guenon, a monkey first described in 1988, can be found. It is named after Mount Birougou,, 975 metres in altitude, one of the highest peaks in the country.

Due to its purported universal cultural and natural significance, it was added onto the UNESCO World Heritage Tentative List on October 20, 2005. Portions of the park have been designated as a Ramsar site since 2007.

References

External links
 Wildlife Conservation Society
 Virtual Tour of the National Parks
 Parc national des Monts Birougou – UNESCO World Heritage Centre

National parks of Gabon
Protected areas established in 2002
2002 establishments in Gabon
Ramsar sites in Gabon